Jana Gana Mana, or simply JGM, is an unfinished Indian Telugu-language military action film directed by Puri Jagannadh. The film stars Vijay Deverakonda, Pooja Hegde, Nayan Rosh T M and Janhvi Kapoor. 

The film commenced its production in June 2022 and was scheduled to be released theatrically on 3 August 2023. However, in September 2022, the film has been reportedly shelved following the huge box office failure of Jagannadh and Deverakonda's previous collaboration, Liger (2022).

Cast 

 Vijay Deverakonda
 Pooja Hegde
 Janhvi Kapoor

Production

Development 
In April 2016, it was confirmed that Puri Jagannadh and Mahesh Babu will team up for a film titled Jana Gana Mana. However due to unknown reasons, it failed to materialize. In 2021, Yash was approached for the film. Later in March 2022, the project was revived with Jagannadh signing Vijay Deverakonda as the male lead. It is produced by Puri Connects and Srikara Studios. In May 2022, Pooja Hegde joined the cast as female lead.

Filming 
Principal photography commenced in June 2022 in Mumbai.

As of September 2022, a schedule of the film has been completed without Deverakonda, with makers spending about ₹20 crore. However, the film is reportedly shelved as an aftermath of the box office failure of Jagannadh and Deverakonda's previous collaboration Liger (2022).

Release 
Jana Gana Mana was scheduled to be released worldwide on 3 August 2023 in Telugu along with dubbed versions in Tamil, Hindi, Malayalam and Kannada languages.

References

External links 
 

2023 films
Upcoming Indian films
Upcoming Telugu-language films
Films shot in Mumbai
Films directed by Puri Jagannadh